During the 1996–97 English football season, Brighton & Hove Albion F.C. competed in the Football League Third Division.

Season summary
In the 1996–97 season, Jimmy Case was sacked after a terrible start that saw Brighton stuck the bottom of the league by a considerable margin — they seemed certain to be relegated from the Football League just 14 years after they had almost won the FA Cup. The club's directors appointed a relative unknown in Steve Gritt, the former joint manager of Charlton Athletic, in hope of performing a miracle survival.

Brighton's league form steadily improved under Gritt, although their improving chances of survival were put under further threat on 9 December by a two-point deduction from the Football League imposed as punishment for a pitch invasion by fans who were protesting against the sale of the Goldstone Ground in a league game against Lincoln City on 1 October 1996. The club later appealed against the points deduction but their appeal was rejected.

The last game at The Goldstone was held on 26 April 1997, in which Brighton beat Doncaster Rovers 1–0. The result lifted Brighton off the bottom of Division Three and meant that a draw or win in their visit to Hereford United the following weekend would prevent relegation to the Conference and preserve their Football League status. Brighton went on to draw the game 1–1 and secure survival, as well as ending Hereford's 25-year stay in the Football League – thus avoiding becoming the first former members of the top flight or the first major cup finalists to be relegated to the Conference.

Final league table

Results
Brighton & Hove Albion's score comes first

Legend

Football League Third Division

FA Cup

League Cup

Football League Trophy

Squad

References

Brighton & Hove Albion F.C. seasons
Brighton and Hove Albion